is a Japanese manga series serialized in Coro Coro Comics, based on Takara's B-Daman toy. It was first released in 1995. An anime series produced by Xebec was shown in TV Tokyo between January 4, 1999 to October 1, 1999.

Characters

Team Guts
Originally, Team Guts consists of only three members in their first ever JBA tournament, but later on in the story, in order to compete in the competition with other teams from different JBA department, other two members are decided for their new team.
The original members of Team Guts are as follow:

Original Team Members
Tosaka Tamago
 Tamago is a young, energetic innocent fifth grade boy who loves everything about B-daman and B-da Battles.  He always recalls crash B-daman as his best friend, and believe in the spirit of B-ders.
Tamago always play his game fairly, and he usually has his own unique style of playing, without logic.  He respects the other B-ders the same way he respects everything about B-daman, and he'll never let a single one humiliate the B-da spirit of all B-ders.
Tamago has a total of eight B-damans in the history of Super B-daman series, including his first ever B-daman, White B-daman. All of his B-damans are Power-Type.  These are Tamago's B-daman, listed order of B-daman he received.
 White B-daman (Owned at the beginning of the story, supposedly from his father)
 Fighting Phoenix (The first upgraded version of OS B-daman, received after White B-daman is destroyed by Ijuin's drive shot)
 Battle Phoenix (Power-Type PI B-daman, received after Fighting Phoenix is destroyed by Ijuin's Kong Cerberus in the final round of JBA tournament)
 Combat Phoenix (Power-Type PI-EX B-daman, received at the second round of second JBA tournament)
 Guardian Phoenix (Power-Type RE B-daman, received at the final round of second JBA tournament)
 Speed Phoenix (Power-Type R-Unit B-Daman)
 Vanguard Phoenix(Power-Type E-Unit B-daman, received at the final round of final battle in JBA )
 Smash Phoenix (???)
Although, Tamago can by clumsy and too innocent at time being, while sighting the world at the bright side.  He's not the smartest one after all, but his instinct and power is beyond normal.

Nishibe Gunma / Sniper Gunma of the West
Tamago's best friend, and also his long-time rival.  Gunma is the most famous B-ders from Kanzai, who is commonly known as "Sniper Gunma" or "Sniper from the West", from his unique accuracy and rapid fire skills.
Gunma is a very strategic and intelligent person. His plan always work as effectively as he planned, and he may even think of some craziest ever tactics to overcome the enemies.  He's the main man of Team Guts, and supposedly, the leader of the team.
Although, unlike Tamago, Gunma is more mature and reasoning.  He look at both side of the world, to observe the good and bad of the situation.  However, after being friend with Tamago, Gunma's mind sometimes becomes out-of-reason, resulting himself trying out many mission-impossible tactics when Tamago is around.  Gunma believes that Tamago's spirit and power are beyond normal, and he admitted that when Tamago is around, anything can be possible.
In the history of Super B-daman series, Gunma supposedly has a total of 6 main b-daman (excluding his collections of other B-daman for researching and developing new tactics).  All of his B-damans support his rapid fire skills and his accuracy in B-da Battles.
 Magnet Bomber (Owned at the beginning of the story, past about this B-daman is unknown)
 Wild Wyvern (The second upgraded OS B-daman, created after the creation of Fighting Phoenix)
 Valiant Wyvern (Rapid-Fire PI B-daman, created after the creation of Battle Phoenix)
 Spread Wyvern (Rapid-Fire PI-EX B-daman, created after the creation of Combat Phoenix)
 Flash Wyvern (Rapid-Fire RE B-daman, created after the creation of Guardian Phoenix)
Although, Gunma is very short-tempered, and rarely can be as clumsy as Tamago is.  Gunma also hates to be humiliated by some B-ders, for being in an infamous unknown team like Team Guts, and for being weak without power.  Gunma's only weak point is that he's scared of ghosts.

Cerer / Magician Cerer
 Golden B-daman
 Stagg Sphinx
 Stagg Cerberus
 Power Sphinx

New members
The two new members are as follow:

Kazama Yoshinori / Billy the Wild Wind of the East
 2 Bomber System B-daman
 Blast Eagle and Blast Lion >>> Blast Griffon
 Phantom Eagle and Phantom Lion >>> Phantom Griffon
 Mirage Eagle and Mirage Lion >>> Mirage Griffon

Negota Nekomaru
 Bomber System B-daman
 Hunting Lynx

Team assistance
The assistance of this team is Dr. Tamano, who is one of the JBA staff that create and research about B-Daman.  Dr. Tamano is known to be one of the very intelligent scientist in the JBA departments, who develop new system for new generation of B-Daman.  Although, with Team Guts themselves, he sometimes act childishly to get some attention from the team.

King B-Das
 Atsumasa Ijuin: Kung Cerberos (jpn), konigh Kelbros (Indonesia), Konig Ceberus / OS System
 Motoo Saotome: Iron Cyclops (PI System)
 Akari Hozomaki: Jungker Unicorn (OS System)

Burglars

Setouchi Viking

Vanquishers

Shining Warriors

JBA

Dark Matter

Others

Product List
 51 White B-Daman
 52 Black B-Daman
 53 Blue B-Daman
 54 Red B-Daman
 55 Gold B-Daman
 58 Green B-Daman
 60 Yellow B-Daman
 64 Angle Shot Special
 65 ???
 68 Return Special
 69 ???
 70 ???
 74 Master Koryuokou Special
 78 Grey B-Daman
 79 Fighting Phoenix
 80 ???
 81 ???
 84 Sniper Special
 85 Dark Blue B-Daman
 90 Wild Wyvern
 94 Stagg Sphinx
 102 Master Koryoukou Special II
 109 Junker Unicorn
 112 Kong Cerberous
 113 Dr. Tamano Special
 114 Battle Phoenix
 115 Iron Cyclops
 116 JBA Proto 01
 117 Blast Griffon
 118 Valiant Wyvern
 120 Natalius Posideidon
 122 Hunting Lynx
 123 Stag Cerberous
 124 OS White B-Daman
 125 OS Black B-Daman
 126 OS Blue B-Daman
 127 Master Koryoukou Special III
 128 Burning Atlas
 129 Combat Phoenix
 130 JBA EX 01
 132 Giga Salamander
 133 EX Shadow Bomb Set
 134 Cool Helios
 135 Spread Wyvern
 136 Shooting Basket Set
 137 Crimson Gigant
 138 Phantom Eagle
 139 Phantom Lion
 140 Blade Orochi
 141 Guardian Phoenix
 142 Striker Gemini
 143 Guardian Phoenix (Pre-Built)
 144 Striker Gemini (Pre-Built)
 145 Guardian Phoenix vs Striker Gemini Set
 146 Guardian Phoenix Black Version
 147 Eternal Eclipse
 148 Burst Orion
 149 Speeder Phoenix
 150 Galaxy Fortress
 151 Gold Guardian Phoenix + Metallic Eternal Eclipse + Clear Burst Orion Set
 152 Flash Wyvern
 153 Flash Wyvern Fierce Blazing Edition (Dark Clear)
 154 Flash Wyvern (Pre-Built)
 155 Powered Sphinx
 156 Hammer Gemini
 157 Mirage Eagle
 158 Vanguard Phoenix
 159 Stinger Scorpion
 160 Smash Phoenix

References

External links
 

1995 manga
1999 anime television series debuts
B-Daman
Shōnen manga
Xebec (studio)
TV Tokyo original programming
Comics based on toys
Television shows based on toys